Amastridium is a genus of snakes in the family Colubridae. The genus is endemic to Mexico, Central America and Colombia.

Species and geographic ranges
The genus Amastridium contains the following two species which are recognized as being valid.
Amastridium sapperi  – Guatemala, Honduras, Mexico
Amastridium veliferum  – Colombia, Costa Rica, Guatemala, Nicaragua, Panama

Nota bene: A binomial authority in parentheses indicates that the species was originally described in a genus other than Amastridium.

Etymology
The specific name, sapperi, is in honor of German explorer Karl Sapper.

References

Further reading

Boulenger GA (1894). Catalogue of the Snakes in the British Museum (Natural History). Volume II., Containing the Conclusion of the Colubridæ Aglyphæ. London: Trustees of the British Museum (Natural History). (Taylor and Francis, printers). xi + 382 pp. + Plates I-XX. (Genus Amastridium, p. 352).
Cope ED (1861). "Descriptions of Reptiles from Tropical America and Asia". Proceedings of the Academy of Natural Sciences of Philadelphia 1860: 368–374. (Amastridium, new genus, p. 370).

Amastridium
Snake genera
Taxa named by Edward Drinker Cope